Ghost Day  is a 2012 Thai horror comedy film directed by  Thanit Jitnukul, Titipong Chaisat, and Sorathep Vetwongsatip. The film is set in modern-day Bangkok where the production team behind the television series Ghost Day is told by their show is going to be cancelled. To stop the end of their program, the staff decide to find a real haunted area and, after viewing a video online by ghostbusters Mhen (Apisit Opasaimlikit) and Chiad (Padong Songsang), they decide to approach them to do a deal. Mhen and Chiad have brought along a real female ghost who appears and possesses the show's director, Pom (Boriboon Chanruang).

The film was shown at the 16th Puchon International Fantastic Film Festival and was the fifth-highest-grossing film in Thailand on its opening week.

Release
Ghost Day was shown at the 16th annual Puchon International Fantastic Film Festival.

The film was released in Thailand on February 23, 2012. It was the country's fifth-highest-grossing film in its opening week, grossing $44,438. It grossed a total of $79,292 on its theatrical run in Thailand.

Reception
Derek Elley of Film Business Asia gave the film a six out of ten rating, referring to the film as "one of the better [Thai horror comedy films], though still very silly."

See also

List of Thai films
 List of ghost films
List of horror films of 2012
List of comedy films of the 2010s

Notes

External links

2012 comedy horror films
2012 films
Thai ghost films
2010s ghost films
Thai comedy horror films